Kalabari may refer to:

 Kalabari tribe, an ethnic group of the Niger Delta region of Nigeria
 Kalabari language, their language
 Kalabari Kingdom, a traditional state within Nigeria
 Kalabari, another name for the city of Calabar, Nigeria
 Kalabari (Assam), a locality in India

Language and nationality disambiguation pages